São Tomé and Príncipe islands were a colony of the Portuguese Empire from its discovery in 1470 until 1975, when independence was granted by Portugal.

History

The Portuguese explorers João de Santarém and Pêro Escobar discovered the islands around 1470, which they found uninhabited. The São Tomé island was named by the Portuguese in honor of Saint Thomas, as they discovered the island on his feast day, while the Príncipe island (Prince's island) was named in honor of Afonso, Prince of Portugal, his father's favorite.

The first attempt of settlement in the islands began in 1485, when the Portuguese Crown granted to João de Paiva the São Tomé island. However, this attempt was not successful, because the settlers were unable to produce food in the specific conditions and climate that the islands offered, and because of the tropical diseases that affected the settlers. It was only in 1493 when King John II of Portugal nominated Álvaro Caminha as captain-major of São Tomé island, that the first successful settlement was established. Among these Portuguese settlers, there was a significant portion of criminals and orphans, as well as Jewish children taken from their parents to ensure that they were raised as Christians. Settlement of the Príncipe island was initiated in 1500. 

In the following years, the Portuguese settlers started to import large numbers of slaves from mainland Africa to cultivate the rich volcanic soil of São Tomé island with highly profitable sugar cane. By the middle of the 16th century São Tomé generated enormous wealth to Portugal when it became the world's largest producer of sugar. The islands humid climate allowed the quick growth of sugar, but prevented the production of higher quality white sugar.

In the first decade of the 17th century, the competition of sugar plantations from the Portuguese colony of Brazil and the frequent slave revolts that occurred in the island, begun to slowly hurt the sugar crop cultivation, This meant the decline of sugar production, and the shifting of the local economy towards the slave trade, who remained mostly in the hands of the local mestiço population. The geographical location of the islands made them a crucial trading post of the transatlantic slave trade, as they served as an assembly point of the slaves brought from the Gulf of Guinea and the Kingdom of Kongo and destined to the Americas.

The Dutch occupied the São Tomé island in 1641, until 1648 when the Portuguese took back the island. The Dutch, however, did not take Príncipe island.

Most Portuguese settlers married African women. Europeans never numbered more than 1000 at their peak in the 16th century, and by the 18th century, prosperous and influential local Afro-Portuguese mulatos came to fill important local positions, such as cathedral chapter and the town-hall, into which they had been admitted as early as 1528. Some were indistinguishable from mainland native Africans, who claimed to be brancos da terra, literally, "the lands whites" on account of their ancestry.

In 1753, because of the frequent attacks by pirates and corsairs, the capital of the São Tomé island was transferred to Santo António on Príncipe, and the islands started being ruled as a single colony, with only one Governor.  It was only in 1852 when the capital was transferred back to São Tomé island.

At the beginning of the 19th century, the Portuguese introduced coffee and cocoa in extensive large-scale plantations called roças, thus giving a great boost to the economy. The coffee production cycle ended in the late 19th century, when it was replaced by cocoa as the islands' main production. São Tomé and Príncipe then became a major global cocoa production area for several generations, and in the first decades of the 20th century, it was frequently the world's annual number one cocoa producer.

In 1972, a nationalist political party of Marxist ideology, the Movement for the Liberation of São Tomé and Príncipe (MLSTP), was created by exiles in Equatorial Guinea with the intent of creating an independent nation. The Carnation Revolution in 1974 ended the Estado Novo dictatorship in Portugal and initiated a process of decolonization of the Portuguese colonies in Africa. On 12 July 1975, the new Portuguese regime granted independence to São Tomé and Príncipe.

Gallery

Colonial architecture

Currency

See also
List of governors of Portuguese São Tomé and Príncipe

Notes

References
Jack P. Greene, Philip D. Morgan, Atlantic History: A Critical Appraisal (2008) 
Richard M. Juang, Noelle Morrissette, Africa and the Americas: Culture, Politics, and History (2008) 
Louis E. Grivetti, Howard-Yana Shapiro, Chocolate: History, Culture, and Heritage (2011) 
Albertino Francisco, Nujoma Agostinho, Exorcising Devils from the Throne: São Tomé and Príncipe in the Chaos of Democratization (2011) 
Amy McKenna, The History of Central and Eastern Africa (2011) 
Anthony Disney, A History of Portugal and the Portuguese Empire (2009)

 
Former Portuguese colonies
Former colonies in Africa
Portuguese colonisation in Africa
History of São Tomé and Príncipe
States and territories disestablished in 1975
Island countries
1975 disestablishments in Africa